Assara leucarma is a species of snout moth in the genus Assara. It was described by Edward Meyrick in 1879 and is found in Australia.

References

Moths described in 1879
Phycitini
Moths of Australia